Dernere Morne is a village in the Les Anglais commune of the Chardonnières Arrondissement, in the Sud department of Haiti.

See also
Boco
Chanterelle
Les Anglais (town)
Limo

References

Populated places in Sud (department)